Hollystown is a townland in north-west Dublin.

References

Towns and villages in Fingal